Sattekalapu Satteyya is a 1969 Indian Telugu-language film written and directed by K. Balachander, starring Chalam, Sobhan Babu and Rajasree. It was released on 19 June 1969. The film was later remade in Tamil as Patham Pasali (1970) by Balachander himself, in Hindi as Mastana (1970) and in Kannada as Manku Thimma (1980).

Plot

Cast 
 Chalam
 Sobhan Babu
 Rajasree
 Roja Ramani
 Gummadi
 S. Varalakshmi
 Satyanarayana
 Vijaya Lalitha

Soundtrack 
The soundtrack was composed by M. S. Viswanathan, while the lyrics were written by Acharya Aatreya, Aarudra, Sri Sri, Rajasri and Kosaraju.

Release and reception 
Sattekalapu Satteyua was released on 19 June 1969. Following Balachander's death in 2014, Deccan Chronicle named Sattekalapu Satteyya as one of his "memorable" films.

References

External links 
 

1960s Telugu-language films
1969 comedy-drama films
1969 films
Films directed by K. Balachander
Films scored by M. S. Viswanathan
Indian comedy-drama films
Telugu films remade in other languages